Buck Owens Sings Tommy Collins is an album by Buck Owens, released in 1963. It reached number one on the Billboard Country Albums charts.

It was re-issued on CD in 1997 by Sundazed Records.

Reception

In his Allmusic review, critic Stephen Thomas Erlewine wrote "Owens didn't have hits with this record, but it did go to number one, and it does stand as one of his most consistently satisfying long-players, thanks to the pen of Tommy Collins and the wonderful performances of Buck Owens & His Buckaroos."

Track listing
All songs by Tommy Collins unless otherwise noted.

Side one
 "If You Ain't Lovin' (You Ain't Livin')" – 2:01
 "But I Do" – 2:26
 "It Tickles" (Tommy Collins, Wanda Collins) – 2:13
 "I Always Get a Souvenir" – 2:19
 "My Last Chance With You" – 2:26
 "Smooth Sailin'" – 2:11

Side two
 "You Gotta Have a License" – 2:15
 "High on a Hilltop" – 2:32
 "There'll Be No Other" – 2:48
 "What'cha Gonna Do Now?" – 2:24
 "No Love Have I" – 2:18
 "Down, Down, Down" – 1:59

Personnel
Buck Owens – guitar, vocals
Don Rich – guitar, fiddle
Mel King – drums
Bob Morris – bass guitar
Jay McDonald – pedal steel guitar
Jelly Sanders – fiddle, guitar
Bonnie Owens – vocals
Production notes
Bob Irwin – mastering
Ken Nelson – producer
Richard Russell – design

References

External links
Reissue review at No Depression magazine.

1963 albums
Buck Owens albums
Capitol Records albums
Bakersfield sound
Albums produced by Ken Nelson (United States record producer)

Albums recorded at Capitol Studios